The I-SPY  books are spotters' guides written for British children, particularly successful in the 1950s and 1960s in their original form and again when relaunched by Michelin in 2009 after a seven-year gap in publishing.

Concept
The I-SPY books are a series of around forty small volumes that have sold hundreds of thousands of copies each, totalling sales of 25 million worldwide by 2010.  Each book in the I-Spy series covers a different subject, such as I-SPY Cars, I-SPY on the Pavement, I-SPY Churches, I-SPY on a Train Journey, and so on. As children spot the objects listed, they record the event in the book and gain points, varying according to how unusual the sight. In the early years of the series, completed books could be sent to Charles Warrell, (known as Big Chief I-SPY) for a feather and order of merit. The children participating in the game were known as The I-SPY Tribe, and by 1953 the I-SPY Tribe had half a million members.

History
The company was supposedly run by a Red Indian chief called Big Chief I-Spy. The original Big Chief I-Spy was Charles Warrell, a former headmaster who created I-Spy towards the end of his working life. He retired in 1956, but lived until 1995 when he died at the age of 106. After Warrell's retirement his assistant Arnold Cawthrow became the second Big Chief, and served in this role until 1978. For part of this time he also worked as an antiques dealer in Islington. He died in 1993, and is commemorated by a stone plaque placed on the outside of the Boatmen's Rooms, the house where he spent some of his last years in Deal, Kent. 

The books were originally self-published in 1948 by Charles Warrell but, after a brief period when they were published by the Daily Mail (the initial four being At the Circus, Secret Codes, Dogs and In the Country), they were taken over by the News Chronicle newspaper and based in the paper's building in Bouverie Street.  The regular I-SPY column, which appeared in the News Chronicle, reverted to the Daily Mail when the News Chronicle ceased publication in 1960, and continued to appear until the late 1980s. The books have had various publishers over the years including the Dickens Press, a company set up to continue the book publishing interests of the News Chronicle, and Polystyle Publications, a publisher of children's comics.

The books became very popular, with print runs well into six figures. Big Chief I-Spy had a succession of assistants, usually known as "Hawkeye". In the early 1970s, this position was held by Ralph Mills. Earlier assistants included Max Heinz and John Tagholm. In the 1980s, following a short-lived third Big Chief, Robin Tucek, David Bellamy replaced Big Chief I-Spy as the person to whom completed books were sent, and the earlier Red Indian connections were quietly dropped.

Michelin Travel Publications acquired and published the series from 1991 until 2002 when they effectively ceased publication, there were ad-hoc sales after that date to clear stocks.

The series was relaunched by Michelin in December 2009 with 12 new titles, followed by a further 12 in Spring 2010. The Bookseller announced the launch in October 2009 with an interview with Michelin Commercial Director Ian Murray. Murray confirmed that the initial 12 titles would include I Spy Birds, Cars, Trees, On a Car Journey and On a Train Journey. The new I-Spy titles are faithful to the original concept but are fully updated and include all new colour images. 

The relaunch of the books and subsequent multiple expansions of the title list suggested that their popularity is being enjoyed by a new generation of children.

News Chronicle Series

I-Spy 6d Series

These followed the same basic format as the early spotter books, as well as keeping the concept of a Big Chief I-Spy, but were issued in a more standard portrait format 4" by 5" (13cm by 10cm). Pocket sized, with thinner covers, each I-Spy title had fifty pages or so of pen drawings and descriptive text. The Daily Mail dropped their involvement after the previous series, and the new look books were launched in conjunction with News Chronicle around 1951. By 1952 the first six of the new titles were in print, with four more planned. The series was in print until 1966, with older titles refreshed every so often and updated.

The News Chronicle was taken over by the Daily Mail in 1960 and closed, but the I-SPY books were by now so popular that the Mail decided to re-associate themselves with the publication once more. The covers were redesigned to remove the News Chronicle name, but the Daily Mail logo was only seen inside the books. Around 1963 even this was removed and the titles were simply published by the Dickens Press (who printed the Mail). With all these changes, up to five distinct editions of some titles exist.

1.	At the Seaside
2.	On the Farm
3.	History
4.	On a Train Journey
5.	Dogs
6.	In the Country
7.	At the Zoo – Animals
8.	At the Zoo – Birds and Reptiles
9.	In the Street
10.	On the Road
11.	The Sights of London
12.	Horses and Ponies
13.	Ships and Harbours
14.	Boats and Waterways
15.	Aircraft
16.	Cars
17.	The Army
18.	The Wheel
19.	Sport
20.	People and Places
21.	Musical Instruments
22.	Men at Work – Building
23.	Antique Furniture
24.	The Unusual
25.	Road Transport
26.	Town Crafts
27.	Country Crafts
28.	The Sky
29.    People In Uniform / People
30.    Motorcycles and Cycles
31.    Bridges
32.    Sports Cars
33.    Roadmaking
34.    The Land
35.    Everyday Machines
36.    In Hospital
37.    Pets
38.    On the Pavement
39.    Churches

I-Spy Colour Series
A companion range of 1/- books, the I-Spy Colour Series was the same size and actually had the same number of pages as their 6d cousins, but used better, thicker quality paper and some inside pages in full colour. Launched probably in 1952 with the first two titles, the colour series issued two new titles each year for a while. The colour books were all natural history subjects and the aim seems to have been to emulate similar but more expensive offerings from publishers like Ladybird and Observer's. Eight titles were issued with the News Chronicle name, and only with the last did they move into more familiar I-Spy territory with In The Garden. When the News Chronicle closed, four further colour titles followed under the Dickens Press name. These were new editions of titles which had originally appeared in the 6d black and white series but been discontinued. The last title came out in 1963 and the 12 books were never numbered. The listing below is the order in which the titles were released. The covers of some of the titles were later updated, and then appeared without the News Chronicle logo.

Birds
Wild Flowers
Butterflies and Moths
Wild Fruits and Fungi
Trees
Insects
In Pond and Stream
In the Garden
Horses and Ponies
Zoo Animals
Dogs
Fish and Fishing

I-Spy Super Series
A larger format launched around 1965 that was very short lived.
Abroad
All the Year Round
Animals in Danger
Archaeology
At the Zoo
British Wild Animals
Cars
Garden Flowers
On a Car Journey
On a Train Journey
On the Seashore
Ships and Boats

The Dickens Press
Published from 1966 to 1972.  Pricing was 1/- in 1966, 1/6 or 7.5p in 1970-71, 9p in 1971-72, 10p in 1972.
Aircraft
Animals at the Zoo
Archaeology
At the Airport*
At the Seaside
Birds
Birds and Reptiles at the Zoo
British Coins*
Buses & Coaches*
Butterflies & Moths
Car Numbers*
Cars
Churches
Civil Aircraft*
Cricket*
Dogs
Farm Animals*
Fishing
Football*
Foreign Coins*
History
Horses & Ponies
In the Country
In the Hedgerow*
In the Street
In the Wood*
London from Trafalgar Square*
Lorries & Vans*
Military Aircraft*
On a Car Journey
On a Train Journey
On the Farm
On the Road
People*
Pets
Ships & Boats
The Sights of London
Signs & Symbols*
The Sky
Stamps*
Starter Book*
Trees
Wild Flowers

* New title

Polystyle Publications Limited
Published from 1973 to 1979. 
Pricing was 10p in 1973, 12p in 1973-74, 15p in 1974, 20p in 1976-77, 25p in 1977-78, 30p in 1977-79.
Animals at the Zoo
Archaeology
At the Airport
At the Seaside
Birds
Birds and Reptiles at the Zoo
British Coins
British Wildlife*
Buses & Coaches
Butterflies & Moths
Car Numbers
Cars
Cats*
Churches
Civil Aircraft
Cricket
Dogs
Farm Animals
Fishing
Football
History
Horses & Ponies
In Spring & Summer*
In the Country
In the Hedgerow
In the Street
In the Wood
Industry*
London from Trafalgar Square
Membership and Code Book
Lorries & Vans
On a Car Journey
On a Train Journey
On the Motorway
On the Road
Pets
Ships & Boats
The Sky
Stamps
Starter Book
Trees
Wild Flowers

* New title

Ravette Limited
Published from 1980 to 1982.  Pricing was 40p in 1982.
Animals at the Zoo
Archaeology
At the Airport
At the Seaside
Birds
Birds and Reptiles at the Zoo
British Wildlife
Butterflies & Moths
Car Numbers
Cars
Cats
Churches
Civil Aircraft
Dogs
Fish and Fishing*
Horses & Ponies
In Spring & Summer
In the Country
In the Hedgerow
In the Street
London from Trafalgar Square
Membership and Code Book
On a Car Journey
On a Train Journey
On the Motorway
The Sky
Trees
Wild Flowers

* New title

I-Spy with David Bellamy
Published from 1983 to 1987.  Price was 65p in 1983.
Archaeology
At the Airport
At the Art Gallery*
Birds and Reptiles at the Zoo
British Coins
British Wildlife
Car Numbers
Cars
Civil Aircraft
Creepy Crawlies*
David Bellamy's I-Spy Book of Nature 1985 (Hardback)*
David Bellamy's I-Spy Book of Nature 1988 (Hardback)*
Dinosaurs*
Fish and Fishing
Garden Birds*
Garden Flowers All the Year Round*
Mammals at the Zoo*
Membership and Code Book (75p)*
Night Sky*
On a Car Journey
On a Day at the Seaside*
On a Train Journey
On the Farm*
Pets*
Pond Life*
Supermarkets*
Trees
Wild Flowers

* New title

Michelin Series
Michelin Original Launch (February 1991 to May 2000)
Includes four "Mini Atlases" and a special colour edition for the opening of the Channel Tunnel (£1.25).

Above Your Head
Aircraft
At the Airport
At the Seaside
Bicycles*
Big Diggers & Working Machines*
Birds
Birds of Prey & Owls*
Buses & Taxis*
Butterflies & Moths
Caravans & Motor Caravans
Cars
Cars II*
Castles*
Cathedrals, Abbeys & Churches*
The Channel Tunnel*
Classic Cars*
Computers*
Creepy Crawlies
Dinosaurs & Prehistoric Animals
Dogs
Fishing & How To Do It*
Flags*
Football
Ghosts, Mysteries & Legends*
Green Britain*
Hadrian's Wall*
History
Horses & Ponies
In France*
In Scotland*
In the Country
In the Lake District*
In the Night Sky*
In the Town*
Inn Signs*
London* (96 pages)
Michelin Mini Atlas Britain*
Michelin Mini Atlas France*
Michelin Mini Atlas Italy*
Michelin Mini Atlas The World
Minerals, Rocks & Fossils*
Motorcycles*
Motor Sport*
Music*
On a Car Journey
On a Car Journey II*
On a Ferry*
On a Train Journey
On the Motorway & Car Numbers*
On the Seashore*
Nature*
Pets
Ships & Boats
Sports*
Steam Engines & Locomotives*
Stonehenge & Historic Wessex*
Surrey*
Trees
Trucks & Trucking*
Trucks & Working Vehicles*
The Weather*
Wild Flowers
Zoos & Wildlife*

Michelin Relaunch (Dec 2009 to June 2013)
Includes three boxed sets (one of which is made up of 70 individual cards). Price was £2.50 in 2011.

Ancient Britain*
Animals*
At the Airport
At the Seaside
Bath*
Birds
Book of Facts*
Cambridge*
Camping*
Car Badges*
Car Collection (4-book boxed set containing Cars, Car Badges, Classic Cars, Every Vehicle on the Road, Notebook)
Cars
Castles & Battles*
Classic Cars
Cool Cars*
Cotswolds*
Creepy Crawlies
Dinosaurs & Prehistoric Animals
Dogs
Edinburgh*
Every Vehicle on the Road*
Explore London* (126 page edition)
Flags
Football Grounds*
Goodwood Festival of Speed*
Great Britain*
Green Britain
High Weald: Things to spot in the countryside of Kent, Sussex & Surrey*
History
In the Countryside
In the Garden
In the Street
Isle of Wight*
Kings & Queens*
Lake District*
London
London's Transport*
Minerals, Rocks & Fossils
Mini World Atlas*
Modern Britain*
Nature
Nature Collection (4-book boxed set containing Nature, In the Garden, Trees, Wild Flowers, Notebook)
The Night Sky
Noteboook*
On a Car Journey
On a Car Journey in France*
On a Ferry
On a Road Trip*
On a Train Journey
On the Motorway
On the Water*
Out & About Car Set (boxed set of 70 cards and Notebook)
Oxford*
Paris*
People & Places
Scottish Nature*
Sports & Games*
Trees
Wild Flowers
Working Vehicles*

* New title

Collins Michelin
What can you spot? (2016 to 2018)

At the Airport
At the Gallery
At the Museum*
At the Seaside
At the Shops*
At the Zoo
Birds
Butterflies & Moths
Camping
Car Badges
Cars
Cool Cars
Creepy Crawlies
Dogs
Every Vehicle on the Road
Flags
Football Grounds
Garden Birds
Holiday Sticker Book*
In the City
In the Countryside
In the Garden
In the Night Sky
In the Street
London
Nature
On a Car Journey
On a Car Journey in France
On a Ferry
On a Road Trip
On a Train Journey
On the Motorway
Something Beginning With...*
Trees
Wild Flowers

Do It!  Score It! (2020)
At the Airport Activity Book*
At the Seaside Activity Book*
In the Countryside Activity Book*
On a Car Journey Activity Book*
On a Train Journey Activity Book*

Spy It! Score It! (2020-present)
At the Airport
At the Seaside
Autumn*
Birds
Butterflies & Moths
Camping
Car Badges
Cars
Castles
Churches & Cathedrals
Cool Cars
Creepy Crawlies
Dogs
Every Vehicle on the Road
Fossils & Rocks
Garden Birds
Horses & Ponies
In the Countryside
In the Garden
In the Night Sky
In the Park*
In the Woods
Ireland*
London
Nature
On a Car Journey
On a Car Journey in France
On a Road Trip
On a Train Journey
On a Walk
On the Farm
On the Motorway
Rivers & Canals
Scotland*
Spring*
Summer*
Trees
Wales*
Wild Flowers
Winter*

Spy It!  Stick It! (2022-present)
My First Farm*
My First Minibeasts*
My First Things that Go*
My First Wildlife*

* New title

I-SPY for Grown Ups
Spoof series released by HarperCollins in 2016.
Signs and Instructions You Must Obey
The UK While It Lasts
At the School Gate
Pets When Human Friendship Is Not Enough

See also

Collecting
I spy, a children's game after which the I-Spy books were named
I Spy With My Little Eye, a children's book based on the I spy game

References

External links
Website for requesting certificates upon achieving 1,000 points in a book (the URL given in the books is dead as of July 2018)

Series of children's books